Frank Genese is a Long Island-based American architect and politician. He is a principal owner of N2 Design+Architecture, PC located in Port Washington, New York.

Life and career 
Prior to joining N2, Genese has had a successful career in the New York design and construction industry. He was a Vice President at D&B Engineers & Architects, PC; Vice President for Capital & Facilities Management at the Queens Library; Vice President and Architect of the Garden at The New York Botanical Garden; served as head of facilities and operations at the New York Institute of Technology (NYIT), the City University of New York, and has held various positions with the government of New York City, including the Office of the Mayor, New York City Department of Design and Construction and the New York City Department of General Services.

Genese is a Commissioner on the Town of North Hempstead Historic Landmarks Preservation Commission, member of the Port Washington Fire Department LOSAP Board, executive member of the Science Museum of Long Island Board of Trustees and a member of the Hempstead Harbor Protection Committee. 

He has served for 25 years on various boards of disabled organizations, including the Eastern Paralyzed Veterans Association/United Spinal Association and the North American Wheelchair Athletic Association.

Genese is licensed to practice architecture in New York, Connecticut, New Jersey and Florida.

Genese serves as a Trustee of the Village of Flower Hill, Long Island, New York. Genese, who had previously served on Flower Hill's Planning Board and Architectural Review Committee, was originally appointed as a Village Trustee following Trustee Robert McNamara's appointment as Mayor when former Mayor Elaine Phillips was elected into the New York State Senate in 2016. He was ultimately re-elected as Trustee by residents.

Genese is an alumnus of the Bronx High School of Science, and attended the State University of New York at Buffalo, where he earned a Bachelor of Professional Studies in Architecture and a Master of Architecture degree.

References 

American business executives
Living people
Flower Hill, New York
People from Long Island
Architects from New York (state)
New York Institute of Technology
City University of New York staff
New York Institute of Technology faculty
Year of birth missing (living people)

External links
N2 Design+Architecture PC
N2 Project Management
Frank Genese AIA